All motorised road vehicles in India are tagged with a registration or licence number. The Vehicle registration plate (commonly known as number plate) number is issued by the district-level Regional Transport Office (RTO) of respective states — the main authority on road matters. The number plates are placed in the front and back of the vehicle. By law, all plates are required to be in modern Hindu-Arabic numerals with Latin letters. The international vehicle registration code for India is IND.

Colour coding

Permanent Registration 
 Private vehicles: 
 Private vehicles, by default, have black lettering on a white background (e.g. TN 75 AA 7106).
 Vehicles which run purely on electricity have white lettering on a green background (e.g. AP 21 BP 7331)
 Commercial vehicles: 
 Commercial vehicles such as taxis, buses and trucks, by default, have black lettering on a yellow background (e.g. UP 19 D 0343).
 Vehicles available on rent for self-drive have yellow lettering on a black background (e.g. KA 08 J 9192).
 Vehicles which run purely on electricity have yellow lettering on a green background (e.g. MH 12 RN 1289)
 Vehicles belonging to foreign missions:
 Vehicles registered to an embassy or United Nations have white lettering on a blue background (e.g. 199 CD 1 and 23 UN 1 respectively).
 Vehicles registered to a consulate have yellow lettering on a blue background (e.g. 199 CC 999).
 Vehicles registered by Indian Armed Forces have white lettering starting with an arrow on a black background (e.g. ↑03D 153874H).

Temporary Registration 
 Unsold vehicles belonging to a vehicle manufacturer or a dealer have white lettering on a red background (e.g. HR 26 TC 7174).
 Sold vehicles awaiting a permanent registration have red lettering on a yellow background (e.g. TS 07 D TR 2020).

Permanent Registration Format

Private and Commercial Vehicles

The current format for the registration of private and commercial consists of four parts:
 ; two alphabets which indicates the State or Union Territory to which the vehicle is registered.
 ; a two-digit number allocated to a district within the respective state or Union Territory. Due to heavy volume of vehicle registration, unique numbers may be allocated to multiple RTO offices within a single district.
 ; consists of one, two or three alphabets or may not exist at all. This shows the ongoing series of an RTO (also acts as a counter of the number of vehicles registered) and/or vehicle classification. Alphabets 'O' and 'I' are not used here to avoid confusion with digits 0 or 1.
 ; it's issued sequentially and is unique to each registration.

This scheme of numbering has some advantages:
 The state or district of registration of a particular vehicle is immediately identifiable.
 In the case of a police investigation of an accident or vehicle-related crime, witnesses usually remember the initial area code letters - it is then quite simple to narrow down suspect vehicles to a much smaller number by checking the database without having to know the full number.

BH (Bharat) series

On 26 August 2021, the Ministry of Road Transport issued a notification regarding a unified pan-India registration of private vehicles. This special registration process was introduced to ease inter-state mobility by eliminating the hassles of re-registering a vehicle when its owner relocates to a new state or Union Territory.

BH-series registration follows a separate format and can be issued to public sector employees of central and state governments, and also to private sector employees of firms with offices in four or more states or union territories.

The format for BH-series registration consists of four parts:
 The first part is a two-digit number which indicates the last two digits of the year in which the vehicle was registered. (example: '22' for a vehicle registered in 2022)
 The second part is 'BH', which is short for Bharat
 The third part is a number ranging between 1 and 9999, issued randomly and unique to each registration.
 The fourth part consists of one or two alphabets. 'O' and 'I' are not used here to avoid confusion with the digits 0 or 1.

Vehicles of Foreign Missions

Registration of vehicles belonging to a foreign mission is carried out by Indian Ministry of External Affairs. The registration format for vehicles consists of three parts:
 The first part is a unique number allocated to the foreign mission by the Ministry of External Affairs.
 The second part consist of two characters, which can be,
 'CD' which is short for corps diplomatique, indicating that vehicle is registered to an embassy
 'CC' which is short for corps consulaire, indicating that vehicle is registered to a consulate
 'UN' which is short for United Nations, indicating that vehicle is registered to one of the UN missions.
 The third part is a number ranging between 1 and 9999, issued sequentially to each mission and unique to each registration

Vehicles belonging to foreign missions are granted the level of diplomatic immunity or consular immunity corresponding to whom the vehicle has been attributed to by the Ministry of External Affairs. Immunity is void if a UN, CD or CC vehicle is driven by a chauffeur or non-diplomat in an absence of an accredited member of the diplomatic or consular corps.

Unique number allocated to different foreign missions which forms the first part of CD and CC registration are listed below, click on 'show' to expand the list:

Vehicles of Indian Armed Forces

The registration format for vehicles belonging to Indian Armed Forces (Army, Navy and Air Force) has five parts:
 The first (or the third) character is an upward-pointing arrow. This is known as a Broad Arrow, whose origins lie in the UK Office of Ordnance and is still used in many parts of the British Commonwealth on assorted army items, not just vehicles. 
 The next two digits (or the two succeeding the arrow) indicate the last two digits of the year in which the armed forces procured the vehicle. (example: '22' for a vehicle procured in 2022)
 The third part is a single alphabet indicating the type or class of vehicle:
A - Two-wheel Vehicle (e.g. motorcycles)
B – Light Motor Vehicle (e.g. passenger cars)
C – Truck (Up to 2.5 tonnes)
D – Truck (3 - 5 tonnes)
E – Specialist Truck, Crane, etc.
K – Ambulance
P – Bus
X – Armoured Vehicles
 The fourth part is a six digit serial number, unique to each registration.
 The fifth part and the last alphabet in registration is a check alphabet.

Format for private and commercial vehicles

Here is a detailed overview of the format for permanent registration of private and commercial vehicles.

Part 1: Two-letter State Codes

All Indian states and Union Territories have their own two-letter code. This two-letter referencing came into action in the 1980s. Before that each district or Regional Transport Officer's office had a three-letter code which did not mention the state. This led to a fair degree of confusion — for example, MMC 8259 could fit in anywhere in the country. To avoid this ambiguity the state code was included along with the district or RTO's office. In some states, such as Maharashtra, licence plates before 1960, when the state was known as Bombay Presidency, bear notations such as BMC.

The newly created states of Uttarakhand, Chhattisgarh, Jharkhand and Telangana (from Uttar Pradesh, Madhya Pradesh, Bihar and Andhra Pradesh respectively), are registering vehicles under their new two-letter codes, while the old numbers registered in the RTO offices of these states under the RTO code of the parent state still stay valid. In 2007, the state of Uttaranchal was renamed as Uttarakhand, thus the state code changed from UA to UK. In 2011, the state of Orissa was renamed as Odisha, thus the state code changed from OR to OD.

The Government of India, Ministry of Road Transport and Highways, the nodal ministry, has formulated strict specifications and enforcement rules for the new High Security Registration Plates (new number plates). The states have recently started introducing them in a phased manner. This standardisation, along with strict enforcement, is expected to bring about a change in law enforcement and in the registration process of vehicles in the country.

The amount of taxes to be paid when purchasing and registering a car are chosen by the state or union territory, with the latter tending to have lower taxes. In particular, Puducherry is known for its low taxes, with many luxury cars being registered there by residents of other places to save money, sometimes fraudulently, leading to crackdowns by states affected by revenue loss in recent years.

Current codes
The list of two-letter codes for states and Union Territory codes is as follows:

Former codes
List of codes no longer in use:

Part 2: District Number

Since all states have two or more districts, the district is in charge of registering the vehicle. A vehicle bears the registration of the district in which it is bought rather than the district of residence of the owner. In many states, officials insist that the plates be changed to the local numbers if the owner shifts residence.

The number of districts in the state need not equal the number of permutations of the district field of the licence plate. Often, in districts with large cities the geographical district can be split into two or more administered regions, each governed by an RTO. A case is the 11 RTOs of Bengaluru Urban District in the state of Karnataka which has the plate bearings KA 01 for HSR Layout (Bengaluru Central), KA 02 for Rajajinagara (Bengaluru West), KA 03 for Kasturinagara (Bengaluru East), KA 04 for Yeshwanthapura (Bengaluru North), KA 05 for Jayanagara (Bengaluru South), KA 41 for Kengeri (Bengaluru West Suburban), KA 50 for Yelahanka (Bengaluru North Suburban), KA 51 for Electronic City (Bengaluru South Suburban), KA 53 for Krishnarajapura (Bengaluru East Suburban), KA 59 for Chandapura (Anekal). Certain RTOs can be set up for dedicated purposes. KA 57 in Shantinagara is dedicated for autorickshaws of Bengaluru Urban District and KA 57 F is registration of the same RTO is exclusive for KSRTC and BMTC buses plying in and out of the district.

In some states such as West Bengal, each RTO issues two numbers i.e., separate numbers for commercial vehicles and private vehicles. E.g. Asansol RTO, has the numbers WB 38 for private vehicles and WB 37 for commercial or public ones.

Also the 01 digit may reflect the capital district of the state, though it may not always be the case.

In some states (such as the state of Delhi, and previously in Gujarat and Bihar) the initial 0 of the district code is omitted; thus Delhi district 2 numbers appear as DL 2 not DL 02. The union territory of Delhi has an additional code in the registration code: DL 9 CAA 1111 where DL is the two letter code for Delhi (DL). The additional C (for category of vehicle) is the letter S for two-wheelers, C for cars and SUVs, E for electric vehicles (in some cases only), P for public passenger vehicles such as buses, R for three-wheeled rickshaws, T for tourist-licensed vehicles and taxis, V for pick-up trucks and vans and Y for hire vehicles. This system is also applicable in other states. (For example, Rajasthan, where RJ is the two letter code, P is for passenger vehicles, C for cars, S for scooters and G for goods vehicles.)
Also, A for Ambulance, M for Milk Van, P for Police

Part 3: Single or multiple alphabets
When the initial 9999 numbers are used up, the RTO adds the letter A before the unique 4 digit number. In some states, the two letters also give the description of the make of the vehicle.

The letters may also reflect the subdivision of the district if the district is geographically large.

In Tamil Nadu, the letter G is reserved for Government (both the Union Government of India and State Governments) vehicles and the letter N is reserved for Government Transport Buses, while A to F, H to M and P to Z are for passenger vehicles of all kinds, including commercial vehicles.
For e.g. TN 60 AG 3333 could be a government vehicle registered in Theni, whereas a TN 58 N 4006 could be a government Bus registered in Madurai District.

In Andhra Pradesh and Telangana, the letter Z is reserved for the State Road Transport (APSRTC) and TSRTC buses (AP**Z, TS**Z, and so on). The letter P (AP 18P, TS 9P, and so on;— Vijayawada RTO and Khairatabad RTO) is reserved for the state police vehicles. The letters T, U, V, W, X, Y is reserved for commercial ones, going on as TA, TB..., UA, UB... and so on whereas rest of the letters are reserved for private passenger vehicles of all kinds.

In Kerala, the number series KL 15 is reserved for the Kerala State Road Transport Corporation (KSRTC) buses. For e.g. KL 15 3431 is an Ashok Leyland KSRTC bus with vehicle code TS-340. Otherwise, all registrations are common, even for commercial vehicles. Also, KL 01 (Thiruvananthapuram RTO) issues registrations for police vehicles around the state.

In Assam, AS 20 is reserved for government buses and AS 30 and AS 31 is reserved for Assam state police. To register commercial vehicles, the letter C is used and goes on like AC, BC, etc. For private vehicles of all kinds, registrations are common.

In West Bengal, there are different number codes for commercial vehicles and private vehicles. RTOs have assigned the letter T to some commercial vehicles, e.g. WB 04 TE, and so on. In areas like Alipur, Barasat, Barrackpore and Howrah, letters were assigned for different classes of vehicles for private vehicles. Now, the same letters are used for all types of vehicles. Kolkata's main RTO at Beltala (WB01, WB02, WB03 and WB04) also has separate RTO number codes for two wheelers and private cars, as well as goods and passenger vehicles

In Odisha, all registrations are common, even for commercial vehicles. Bhubaneswar has two registration numbers OD 02 and OD 33. The OD 02 is used for RTO jurisdiction of Old Bhubaneswar and OD 33 is used for RTO jurisdiction of Patia, Bhubaneswar.

In Jammu and Kashmir, all registrations are common, even for commercial vehicles. However, the letter Y is used for all government buses.

In Punjab, all registrations are common, even for commercial vehicles. PB 01 is used to register tourist vehicles.

In Bihar, all RTO's assigns the letter P for passenger vehicles (Commercial vehicles and SUVs) and G for goods vehicles, e.g. BR 01 PC 2433 is a BSRTC bus in Patna. However, for private vehicles, all registrations are common.

In Himachal Pradesh HP 01 and HP 02 are reserved for tourist vehicles and also the first letter of the district is used, e.g. HP 01 D refers to a taxi in Dharamshala. Otherwise, all registrations are common, even for commercial vehicles.

In Maharashtra, the two letters in each RTO is classified for a different kind of vehicle, e.g. MH 14 BT is assigned for MSRTC buses built in the bus building facility Pimpri, MH 02 CR is for commercial vehicles in Mumbai, MH 10 CJ is for two wheelers in Sangli, MH 04 GM is for cars in Thane, MH 12 JK is for special purpose vehicles in Pune and MH 47 D is for autorickshaws in North Mumbai.
For e.g. after letter A letter B will be given after z letter AAwill be given and so on.

In Karnataka, blank, A, B, C, D is used for commercial vehicles; T for tractors and trailers; E, H, J, K, L, Q, R, S, U, V, W, X, Y for two wheelers; M, N, P, Z for private passenger vehicles. G is used for Government Vehicles and F is used for KSRTC/NWKRTC/NEKRTC/BMTC buses. Additional letters are added as each series is exhausted e.g. M, MA, F, FA and so on.

In Madhya Pradesh the numbering system is similar to other states, with a few exceptions: MP 01 are reserved for Madhya Pradesh Raj Bhavan i.e. Madhya Pradesh Governor's Secretariat and Governor's Household Establishment, MP 02 are reserved for the state government vehicles, MP 03 is reserved for the Madhya Pradesh Police, while MP 04 are reserved for state capital RTO i.e. Bhopal. This pattern is followed in Chhattisgarh also with CG 01 for vehicles of Governor's Office, CG 02 for state government vehicles, CG 03 for Chhattisgarh Police and CG 04 for state capital RTO i.e. Raipur. In Madhya Pradesh vehicles used in agricultural purpose are numbered with series A (e.g. AA, AB, AC etc.), big cars by B, small cars by C, special purpose vehicle such as ambulance, crane etc. by D, medium size goods vehicle by G, heavy vehicles by H, small loading vehicle by L, motor cycles by M, passenger buses by P, passenger auto by R, Scooter by S, taxis by T and passengers by E, F, I, J, K, N, Q, U to Z.

When a series is exhausted or reaches MZ, the RTO can start any other series. For example, Bhopal adopted AM, DM, EM following M while Indore started NA, NB, NC, and now series Q is running. This allocation is similar in Chhattisgarh also.

In Goa, the letter X is reserved for the State Road Transport (Kadamba Transport Corporation) buses (e.g. GA 03 X 0109). The letters T, U, V, W, Y, Z are reserved for commercial vehicles, whereas the letter G is reserved for government vehicles. Again, the two letter in each RTO is classified for a different kind of vehicle, e.g. GA 07 C is for cars in Panaji and GA 03 AB is for two wheelers in Mapusa.

In Uttar Pradesh, all registrations are common for private vehicles. Districts use G for government vehicles and any letter for commercial. Currently most districts use T, AT, BT, etc.; some use N, AN, BN, etc., and a few use B, H, etc.

In Uttarakhand, the letter C is reserved for goods vehicles, T for Taxis, P for public transport vehicles and G for government vehicles and A, B, D to O, Q to S, and U to Z for private passenger vehicles of all kinds, with an additional letter added later such as TA, CA, GA, PA and so on.

For example, the official vehicle of the state Home Secretary uses the number "UK 07 GF 9999" and that of the Director General (Information and Public Relations) uses the number "UK 07 GE 9000". The vehicle of the Chairman of the State Sugar Corporation has the number "UK 07 GE 0900".

The registration number of the official vehicle of the now ousted Chief Minister read "UK 07 GB 0999".

Further, UK 07 TA 0251 could be a taxi in Dehradun and UK 07 PA 0250 could be a local bus in Dehradun.

In the North East excluding Assam:

Meghalaya issues ML 01, ML 02, ML 03 for government vehicles, while ML 02 specifically for the Police department and ML 03 for the transport department, and registration is common for all vehicles.
 Sikkim issues the letter P as prefix for all types of private vehicles and T for taxis, J for commercial jeeps, B for buses, and Z, D for other commercial vehicles. For state transport buses, the SK 04 XXXX series of Jorethang was used and have now gone back to register them under B series.
Arunachal Pradesh issues AR 02 for its government buses, otherwise all registrations are common, even for commercial vehicles.
Nagaland issues different letters for all types of vehicles.
 In Tripura, Mizoram and Manipur, all registrations are common, even for commercial vehicles.

In Gujarat, government vehicles have number plate with letter G and GJ, which is reserved for government firm vehicles. (e.g. : GJ 18 G 5123 and GJ 18 GJ 6521). All other letters except G are used by passenger vehicles. The letters T, U, V, W, X, Y, Z are reserved for commercial vehicles and goes on in the series AT, AU, ..., BT, BU, ..., and so on.

Also, the number series GJ 18 Y is reserved for the Gujarat State Road Transport Corporation (GSRTC) buses (e.g. GJ 18 Y 5432). GJ 18 V was used earlier. After the completion of this series GJ 18 Y was used (e.g. GJ 18 V 8844). Currently, GJ 18 Z is in use. All other letters used for passengers. Also a letter is prefixed for usage in all classes of vehicles, e.g. GJ 01 J to JS are for two wheelers in Ahmedabad, and GJ 01 R to RZ are reserved for private four wheelers in Ahmedabad. However, after the exhaustion of private series in Ahmedabad, vehicles are being registered with the T to Z suffix pattern to meet the demand.

In Delhi, the following letters are used for registration-
A for ambulances, B for mini buses, C for cars, F for numbers on demand for private vehicles, G for trucks, K for school vehicles, L for trucks, N for NRIs (e.g. DL 3C NA, DL 2S ND), P is for buses, Q are for commercial three wheelers, R for autorickshaws and radio taxis, S for two wheelers, T for city taxis, Y for private taxis, V, W, E, U, M, Z for other commercial vehicles. DL 1 at Mall Road registers only A, E, G, K, L, M, P, Q, R, T, U, V, W, Y and Z.

In Chandigarh, the following letters are used for registration: T is for trucks, G is for government vehicles. CH 02 registers commercial vehicles. Registration for all private vehicles is common.

In Rajasthan, the following letters are used for registration: M, S, B for two wheelers, C for cars, P for buses, G for trucks, T for taxis and tourist passenger vehicles. Earlier, numbers between 1 and 50 were used, e.g. RJ 14 2M and RJ 14 6C were used for vehicles but now this system has been stopped.

In Haryana, there are different codes for commercial vehicles and different for private vehicles. Private registrations are common.

In the union territories of Andaman and Nicobar Islands, Dadra and Nagar Haveli and Daman and Diu, Lakshadweep and Puducherry all registrations are common, even for commercial vehicles.

Part 4: Unique number between 1 and 9999

The last four digits numbers are unique to the vehicle. Usually, the lower 100 numbers are government registered numbers, but it may not always be the case. Special "lucky" numbers (also called fancy numbers) such as 3333 or 6666 fetch a premium and may touch above 1,00,000.

Prior to 2005, Karnataka used to charge 1000 for obtaining a unique last four digit number. These numbers used to be issued either from the current running series or from one or two future series. When the numbering system was computerized, numbers could be issued from any future series. However the Karnataka RTO steeply hiked these charges to 6,000 if the number to be obtained is in the current series, and 25,000 if it was to be issued from a future series. It was increased again in 2010 from 6,000 to 20,000, and from 25,000 to 75,000.

As of 2007, Maharashtra has increased the price of unique numbers to the range of 25,000 to 1,25,000. In 2012, Maharashtra increased the price from 1,25,000 to 2,00,000.

In Uttarakhand, number 0001 and 0786 has the highest charge of 50,000.

In Gujarat, RTO is charging 500 for 2-wheeler vehicles and 1,000 for 4-wheeler vehicles for chosen number plate, but the chosen number plate not be unique, Ex 4521, 6523, etc. For VIP number 1 (4-wheeler vehicle), RTO distribute an application form to bid for unique number plate which will be attached with amount of money. The highest payer of the amount will get the unique number like 1. Sometimes it takes 2,00,000 to 5,00,000 (maximum) for this type of number. Currently, Gujarat RTO has revised the amount for chosen number (not unique numbers like single, double digit), which is 1000 for 2-wheeler vehicles and 5000 for 4-wheeler vehicles.

In Andhra Pradesh the RTO Follows the Auction system for unique numbers. The highest bidder gets the number. Numbers like 0909 0999 0099 0009 are in high demand always and have a high premium and maximum bidders for the auction.

Temporary Registration Format
As soon as a vehicle is purchased, the dealer of the vehicle issues a temporary license sticker known colloquially as a TR (To Register) number. In Maharashtra (TC test certificate no.is given). This is valid for one month, during which the owner must register the vehicle in the controlling RTO of the area in which the owner is residing to get a standard license plate. Some states like Tamil Nadu do not allow vehicles with TR numbers on the road, the dealer will hand over the vehicle to the purchaser only after the registration process is done. To register a vehicle, it has to be presented to the RTO's office, where a Motor Vehicle Inspector will verify the applicant's address and other details, confirm that the engine and chassis numbers are identical to what is written in the application and issues a permanent registration certificate which is usually valid for 20 years. The permanent registration certificate is one of the four important documents a vehicle plying on the road should always have; the others being a valid insurance certificate, a pollution under control (PUC) certificate and the driver's license. For public utility vehicles like buses, trucks, taxis and pick-up vans, there are a number of additional documents like a road-worthiness certificate and a transportation permit.

HSRP: High Security Registration Plate
On June 1, 2005, the Government of India had amended rule 50 of the Central Motor Vehicles Rules, 1989, mandating introduction of new tamper proof High Security Registration (HSRP) number plates. All new motorised road vehicles that came into the market after that needed to adhere to the new plates, while existing vehicles had been given two years to comply. Features incorporated include the number plate having a patented chromium hologram, a laser numbering containing the alpha-numeric identification of both the testing agency and manufacturers and a retro-reflective film bearing a verification inscription "India" at a 45-degree inclination. The characters are embossed on the plate for better visibility. The letters "IND" were printed in a light shade of blue on the observers left side under the hologram. However it has yet to be implemented since the various state Governments has not yet appointed an official source for manufacture of these plates, due to disputes which are currently in various Indian courts. On 8 April 2011 the Supreme Court of India summoned the transport secretaries of Delhi, Punjab and Uttar Pradesh for contempt of court proceedings regarding nonenforcement of the high-security registration plates. The Supreme Court on 30 November 2004, had clarified that all states had to comply with the scheme. Currently all of North East including Assam, Gujarat, Rajasthan, Jammu and Kashmir, West Bengal, Karnataka, Andaman & Nicobar Islands (UT) and Goa are the only states which have complied in full. The states of Bihar, Jharkhand, Uttar Pradesh, Madhya Pradesh, Chhattisgarh, Odisha and Maharashtra have not proceeded after having called tenders. Besides these states some of the other states have also taken action to implement the new scheme.

Haryana and Punjab has launched the High Security Registration Plates Scheme in the state. High Security Registration Plates have been made mandatory in for all new and old vehicles.

Maharashtra announced that it had planned to implement new number plates soon.

History
Between 1902 and 2009, all plates were owner provided; since 2009, plates are officially issued, however previous registrations are still valid.

Before 1939, only one letter with four numbers were issued (e.g. N 7612).

From 1939 until 1947, two letters and four numbers scheme were issued (e.g. KA 9823).

From 1947 until the late 1980s (June 30, 1989), the Indian licence plate system followed the scheme:

Where B was the state code (e.g. C for Karnataka since K was allotted to Kerala); MU were letters of the specific RTO; and 7711 was the unique licence plate number. Older vehicles still exhibit this legally valid numbering scheme.

In Portuguese Goa, which was annexed by India in 1961, the scheme was Ixx-99-99 (before 1937 I-99999), second letters and third letters reserved by district.

When Madhya Pradesh was known as Central Province (then using code C), all vehicle licence plates began with:
 CPZ — For All Government vehicles
 CPP — Central Province Police
 CPX — where "X" represented the district code (for example, vehicles registered in Jabalpur had a registration plate starting with CPJ)
When renamed to Madhya Pradesh, then using code M:
 MPZ — For all Government vehicles
 MPP — Madhya Pradesh Police
 MPX — where "X" represented the district (for example, vehicles registered in Jabalpur had a registration plate starting with MPJ)

In the early 2000s, the number plate colouring scheme changed from white over black (BMU 7711) to black over white (BMU 7711) for private non-commercial vehicles, and from black over white (BMU 7711) to black over yellow (BMU 7711) for all other vehicles. The usage of the older colour scheme was made illegal after a period during which both styles were tolerated.

The President of India and The Governors of Indian States used to travel in official cars without licence plates. Instead they had the Emblem of India in gold embossed on a red plate. But now they also have ordinary licence plates.

See also

References

External links

 List of two-letter codes
 Government of Tamil Nadu - State Transport Authority
 HSRP Registration
 HSRP Punjab
 Ministry of Road transport and Highways

India
License plates
India transport-related lists
 Registration plates